Chika Wali is a Nigerian football player who last played as a centre back for Ozone in the I-League 2nd Division.

Career

Early career
From the grounds of River State in Nigeria to Pune, this solidly built Nigerian has come some distance in every sense of the phrase. 
Chika started playing the game when he was eight beginning with school games and all school tournaments. He was then picked to play for his state where he used to play as a defensive midfielder. Incidentally, Chika, in his early days wanted to be a striker – he loved scoring goals – but a coach said that he would go much further in the game if he played back considering his height and physique. Later a scout spotted him and got him a contract to play for a club in the neighboring country of Benin, a two hours drive from Chika’s place in Nigeria. He spent a season there – his first as a professional in the game.

Pune
He came to India as a teenager on the invitation of Pune after a close friend of Chika introduced him to Nigel Empson, a manager in India, who then brought him to the notice of Pune FC leading to his present contract. This is his sixth year in India as a pro. 

Chika has been a key part of the PFC team which won promotion to the I-League and has gone on to establish itself as a major force in Indian football, finishing second in the I-League in season 2012-13. Hugely popular with the fans and his team-mates, Chika has shown commendable loyalty to PFC. Clean living and dedicated Chika is a player with the character and dedication to do extremely well in the game

Ozone FC
On 26 October 2017 Ozone announced the signing of chicka wali for their upcoming I-League 2nd Division campaign. He made his debut for the club in their first group stage match of 2016–17 I-League 2nd Division against Kenkre. However, the club failed to progress to the final round of the league and finished third in their group.

References

External links
 http://www.indianfootball.com/en/statistic/player/detail/playerId/583
 http://goal.com/en-india/people/nigeria/28861/wali-chika

Nigerian footballers
Nigerian expatriate sportspeople in India
1990 births
Living people
Expatriate footballers in India
I-League players
Pune FC players
Salgaocar FC players
Mumbai FC players
Dempo SC players
Association football central defenders
Aryan FC players
Calcutta Football League players